The Port of Tanjung Pelepas (PTP, UN/Locode: MYTPP) is a container port located in Iskandar Puteri, Johor Bahru District, Johor, Malaysia, and is part of the APM Terminals Global Terminal Network, which holds a minority share in the joint venture.

The port is situated on the eastern mouth of the Pulai River in south-western Johor, Malaysia, in close proximity to the Straits of Johor, which separates the countries of Malaysia and Singapore and the Strait of Malacca. Transshipment accounts for over 90 per cent of the port's traffic and was constructed in an attempt to compete with Singaporean ports.

History

In June 2020, 110 containers of toxic electric arc furnace dust, amounting to some 1,864 tonnes, were found at the port. The Malaysian government said it would work to repatriate the waste.

Facilities 

The current port offers 14 berths totaling 5 km of linear wharf length, and a 1.2 million square meters container yard which contains around 240,000 TEU in storage space, 48,374 ground slot and 5,080 reefer points.

The berths are serviced by 66 Super Post-Panamax quay cranes, 24 (EEE crane) with 24 rows outreach, 11 of which have a 22 rows outreach and dual hoist 40’ pick, 30 with 22 rows outreach and twin 20’ lift. The total capacity of the port today is over 12.5 million TEU per year with 174 rubber tyred gantry cranes and 498 prime movers operates around the container facility.

In addition to road connectivity, the port is also connected to the peninsula's freight railway system that extends from Johor to the south to southern Thailand to the north, via a 4-track rail terminal. The port development area covers 2,000 acres for the port terminal and 1,500 acres for the free trade zone. The port has a harbour with a draft of 15 – 19 metres, and a turning basin of 720 metres.

The 2007 master plan of the port envisages over 95 berths with 150 million TEU terminal handling capacity. The berths are expected to extend from the mouth of the Pulai River to Malaysia–Singapore Second Link.

See also
Iskandar Puteri
List of Asian ports

References

External links 

 
Map of Road from Tanjung Pelapas Port to Senai Airport
Shipping Portal: PTP

2000 establishments in Malaysia
Ports and harbours of Johor
South Johor Economic Region
Container terminals
APM Terminals